Peck Lake is man-made lake in the Town of Bleecker, New York in Fulton County, in the southern Adirondack region. It was created with a dam and combined the old Peck's Pond, East Lake, and Gould Lake. The lake is named after John Peck.

History 
The Mohawk Hydro-Electric Company, wanted to build a hydroelectric station in Ephratah, and needed an upstream reservoir that produced enough water for the operation of this plant. Peck's Pond was chosen due to its close location. The power company built a dam at the outlet of the present day mill pond. The dam raised the water level 20 or so feet.

References

Lakes of Fulton County, New York
Lakes of New York (state)